Jan Callewaert (1956 – 1 February 2022) was a Belgian businessman. He was the general manager of Option N.V. In 2005, he was voted manager of the year in Belgium. He also was the chairman of football club Oud-Heverlee Leuven.

Life and career
Callewaert was born in Wielsbeke in 1956. He obtained a Master in commercial sciences and a bachelor in philosophy at the Katholieke Universiteit Leuven.

From 1980 to 1982, he was assistant at the VLEKHO in Brussels. He later became a system engineer, and then product manager at Bull until 1984 when he joined Ericsson telecommunication. In 1986, he founded Option International, and started the production of modems for laptops. He received the Manager of the year award in 2005. Callewaert died on 1 February 2022, at the age of 65.

Bibliography
 Jan Callewaert, Van de hemel naar de hel en weer terug (E: From heaven to hell and back again), Lannoo.

References

Sources
 Lunchcauserie met Jan Callewaert, Option
 Jan Callewaert (Option) is Manager van het Jaar 2005

1956 births
2022 deaths
Belgian businesspeople
Belgian chief executives
Oud-Heverlee Leuven
People from West Flanders